The 1979 Masters (officially the 1979 Benson & Hedges Masters) was a professional non-ranking snooker tournament that took place from Monday 22nd to Friday 26 January 1979 at the Wembley Conference Centre in London, England, which would host the tournament until the venue's demolition in 2006. 10 players were invited for the tournament.

Perrie Mans of South Africa won the first Masters tournament held at the Wembley by defeating Alex Higgins 8–4 in the final. Notably Perrie Mans won the event without making a break above 50.

Main draw

{{16TeamBracket-Compact-NoSeeds-Byes
| seed-width  =
| team-width  = 180
| score-width =
| RD1=Round 1Best of 9 frames
| RD2=Quarter-finalsBest of 9 frames
| RD3=Semi-finalsBest of 9 frames
| RD4=FinalBest of 15 frames
| RD1-team07=
| RD1-score07=2
| RD1-team08=
| RD1-score08=5
| RD1-team15=
| RD1-score15=4
| RD1-team16=
| RD1-score16=5
| RD2-team01=
| RD2-score01=5
| RD2-team02=
| RD2-score02=2
| RD2-team03=
| RD2-score03=0
| RD2-team04= Doug Mountjoy
| RD2-score04=5
| RD2-team05=

Final

Century breaks
Total: 2
 132  Alex Higgins
 111  Doug Mountjoy

References 

Masters (snooker)
Masters
Masters (snooker)
Masters (snooker)
Masters